Villeneuve XIII RLLG originally called Sports Athletic Villeneuvois XIII are a semi-professional rugby league team based in Villeneuve-sur-Lot in the region of Aquitaine in southern France. Formed in 1934, the first French rugby league club, they currently play in the Elite One Championship the highest level of rugby league in France. They have won both the league title and the cup on nine occasions. Their home stadium is the Stade Max Rousie.

History
Sports Athletic Villeneuvois XIII were founded during the last two weeks of May 1934 by French rugby league pioneer Jean Galia who went on to be the club's first coach/captain and backed by the mayor. Villeneuve quickly went on to become a rugby league stronghold. The new club picked up some players from the local rugby club CA Villeneuve including Ernest Camo, Jean Barres, Jean Rabot and Max Rousie and others from Perpignan like Aimé Bardes, Martin Serre, Jean Daffis and François Noguères in readiness for the first French rugby league championship. SA Villeneuve were the first club to become a member of the Ligue Française de Rugby à 13 (LFR.13) on 2 June 1934. Villeneuve remain as the oldest rugby league club in France, they became the first French club side to tour England in September 1934. On that tour they played against Warrington, Broughton Rangers, Hull FC, Yorkshire XIII, Oldham, and Leeds. Max Rousie starred for the tourists scoring 76 of their 117 points. The club then hosted both a touring Yorkshire XIII and then Salford RLFC.

Villeneuve began the inaugural French Rugby League Championship in 1934 by beating XIII Catalan 48-25 at the Pont-de-Marot they would go on and win the first championship by finishing top of the table. At the end of the season they took on the English rugby league champions Swinton going down 25-27 in front of a crowd of 15,000. Having lost the 1936 Lord Derby Cup Final they made amends in 1937 by defeating XIII Catalan 12-6. At the outbreak of war and the German invasion of France, Rugby League under the Vichy Government was banned. Villeneuve were forced to play rugby union under a new club name Union Sportive Villeneuve XV.  Towards the end of the Second World War rugby league was re-established and rugby league returned to Villeneuve under a new name Union Sportive Villeneuve XIII. The reborn club met AS Carcassonne at the Parc des Princes in Paris on 4 February 1945 in an exhibition match, the first rugby league game played in France after the war.

Villeneuve became national champions again in 1959, 1964 and twice more in the early 1980s. They also lifted the Lord Derby Cup in 1958, 1964, 1979 and 1984. In 1998 the club added the nickname "Les léopards d'Aquitaine", The Leopards of Aquitaine. Also in this year rugby union's bad treatment of rugby league reared its ugly head again. Villeneuve were preparing for an evening match to be screened live on national television at SU Agen Rugby Club when the union authorities refused to let Agen host the game thus the game had to be cancelled.

Villeneuve experienced a glorious era from 1996 to 2003, appearing in every league championship Grand Final bar one. They won five championships in eight years culminating in their 31-18 victory over St. Gaudens in 2003. Villeneuve played in four Lord Derby Cup finals in this period and won every one. In seasons 1999, 2002 and 2003 they completed the league and cup double. The 1999 double winning team was inspired by former Australian captain Paul Sironen. The 2002 and 2003 double seasons were done under the coaching of Jean Luc Albert. At this time the club was the strongest in the league and could call upon some of the best French internationals in Laurent Carrasco, Laurent Frayssinous, Vincent Wulf, Romain Sort, David Despin and Frederic Banquet as well as experienced oversea stars like Paul Sironen and former New Zealand captain Quentin Pongia  During this period they also became the first French club to reach the quarter-finals of the prestigious Rugby League Challenge Cup in 2001. After beating Simms Cross ARLFC, York Wasps and Rochdale Hornets they eventually went out to Super League side Warrington Wolves. They were also crowned European champions in 1998 when they lifted the Treize Tournoi beating Lancashire Lynx in the final.

In 2005 the club went bankrupt but a new club was quickly formed named Villeneuve XIII Rugby League and thus retaining their place in the top flight. The Léopards made history in 2005 when they signed the Russian international halfback, Ouchillikos Novel. He was signed after an impressive performance in the defeat to France in the 2005 European Nations Cup. In 2015 the club faced closure again but after starting a 'Help save Villeneuve XIII'  supporters around the world and business's made donations and saved the club from extinction. For the following season the club adopted its new name Villeneuve XIII RLLG

The club continues to run successful academy sides, begun in the 1930s, and now runs both ladies and girls teams.

Challenge Cup 
As one of the more dominant sides in the French competition, when the RFL in England began inviting overseas teams to compete in the Challenge Cup Villeneuve were one of the first clubs to enter. In 2000 they arrived with a bang when they won 16-14 at Keighley Cougars before going on to lose to Dewsbury Rams. The following season they eclipsed this when they reached the quarter-finals, becoming the first overseas team to do so. After despatching amateurs Simms Cross they then accounted for York Wasps and Rochdale Hornets before bowing out to Warrington Wolves 0-32. The next campaign saw them once again beat York Wasps before losing to Doncaster. Their last outing came the following season where they went out at the first attempt away at Featherstone Rovers to a last minute try.

2000 
 All away games *
 13 February v Keighley Cougars 16-14
 27 February v Dewsbury Rams 10-35

2001 
 26 January v Simms Cross ARLFC 42-10
 11 February v York Wasps 22-8
 25 February v Rochdale Hornets 26-19
 11 March v Warrington Wolves 0-32

2002 
 10 February v York Wasps 17-8
 24 February v Doncaster RLFC 16-24

2003 
 ?  January v Featherstone Rovers 22-26

Villeneuve v Australia

Colours and Badge 
The club have always played in green and white. The nickname Leopards was adopted in 1998

Stadium 
From 1900 to 1955 the rugby club played at Pont-de-Marot. In 1955 their current stadium was built originally called Myre Mory Stadium named after a soldier killed in 1940 and located on the left bank of the river Lot near the Lycee Georges Leygues. In 2011 the stadium renamed Stade Max Rousie after the famous former France and Villeneuve rugby league footballer. A multi sports venue that hosts along with rugby league, football, athletics and tennis. The ground has floodlights as well as two training pitches. The current capacity is 5,000 with 1.434 seats.

Current squad 
Squad for 2022-23 Season

Honours
 Elite One Championship (9): 1934-35, 1958–59, 1963–64, 1979–80, 1995–96, 1998–99, 2000–01, 2001–02, 2002–03
 Lord Derby Cup (9): 1937, 1958, 1964, 1979, 1984, 1999, 2000, 2002, 2003
 Treize Tournoi (1): 1998
 Junior League Trophy (12): 1936-37, 1937–38, 1938–39, 1939–40, 1945–46, 1959–60, 1979–80, 1988–89, 1989–90, 1998–99, 1999-2000, 2000–01
 Junior Cup Trophy (6): 1960, 1961, 1977, 1978, 1989, 1990

International Players

French or assimilated

SA Villeneuve XIII

US Villeneuve XIII

Villeneuve XIII RL

Foreigners
 USV.13 :
Mark Bourneville (New Zealand)
Paul Sironen (Australia)
Shaun Austerfield (England)
Grant Doorey (Australia)
Dragan Durdevic (Australia);
Jason Webber (Australia);
Brock Mueller (Australia);
Chad Dillinger (Australia);
Quentin Pongia (New Zealand);
Artie Shead (New Zealand);
Phillip Shead (New Zealand);
Tim Ryan (Australia);
Steven Plath (Australia);

Note
Maurice Brunetaud and Henri Durand are members of the very small group of French rugby players who were Internationals before and after WWII and Rugby League's banishment by Vichy (Oct. 1940 to Sept.1944).

Coaches

Presidents

Famous players, coaches, presidents

References

External links
  Official website
  Club forum

French rugby league teams
Sport in Lot-et-Garonne
1934 establishments in France
Rugby clubs established in 1934